Graham Phillips is an Australian television presenter. Previously a member of the Catalyst team, he has also presented the technology programmes Beyond Tomorrow and Hot Chips.

External links
 
 Catalyst biography
 Graham Phillips Website

Australian television presenters
Living people
Year of birth missing (living people)